Awesomeness (abbreviation of AwesomenessTV) is an American-based film and television studio as well as a multi-channel based multilingual television network owned by Paramount Digital Studios, a division of Paramount Global. Established in June 2012 by Brian Robbins and Joe Davola, the network initially focused on children’s programs, teen dramas, comedies, live events, and music videos targeting adolescents and young adults.

AwesomenessTV initially operated an eponymous YouTube channel and multi-channel network. The company later expanded into talent, branded content, music, publishing, and retail. In 2013, DreamWorks Animation acquired AwesomenessTV. In 2014, Hearst Corporation acquired a 25% minority stake. In 2016, Verizon Communications acquired another roughly-quarter stake in the company for $159 million (valuing it at $650 million), while AwesomenessTV entered into a multi-year deal to produce content for Verizon's streaming video service go90.

In 2018, following NBCUniversal's acquisition of DWA (which led to conflict due to being owned by Verizon competitor Comcast) and the shutdown of the fledgling go90, Viacom acquired AwesomenessTV for around $50 million – a fraction of its 2016 valuation. Since its purchase by Viacom, the studio has focused more on long-form television series and films for over-the-top services, and has referred to itself as targeting generation Z.

History

Beginnings 
In July 2012, founders Brian Robbins and Joe Davola launched AwesomnessTV as part of the YouTube Original Channel Initiative, producing various web series oriented towards a tween and teenage audience. Robbins had personally observed his two sons as examples of changing media consumption trends among the demographic, which had increasingly favored short-form internet video over television.

Robbins had been well known for his work on series such as One Tree Hill, Smallville, and several Nickelodeon series, such as the sketch comedy All That. In 2009, Robbins spearheaded the production of a film based on YouTube comedian Lucas Cruikshank's character Fred. Robbins and Cruikshank bankrolled it as an independent film for Nickelodeon—where it became the highest-rated basic-cable film of the year among youth in 2010 and spawned a larger franchise of Nickelodeon content featuring the character.

The channel had an initial slate of 15 series in development, including the talk show IMO; the stunt shows The Blow-Up Guys, teen drama The Runaways, and Awesomeness Sports (a series of videos that would feature professional athletes and showcase youth athletes). Davola compared the channel to MTV upon its launch, explaining that "it was maverick, it was brand new, it was something the young people were getting involved with."

Brett Bouttier joined as a chief operating officer in November 2012. In December 2012, AwesomenessTV launched a multi-channel network targeting similar demographics.

2013–2018: DreamWorks and Verizon 
On May 1, 2013, DreamWorks Animation announced its intent to acquire AwesomenessTV for $33 million. It was also announced that AwesomenessTV would develop and operate a YouTube channel focusing on content from DWA's franchises. In October 2013, the company partnered with the teen magazine Seventeen to operate its YouTube channel.

In April 2014, AwesomenessTV acquired the MCN and talent management company Big Frame for $15 million. That month, the company also hired former Claire's CEO James Fielding to lead a new consumer products division. In June 2014, AwesomenessTV launched DreamWorksTV, a YouTube channel that featured shorts and original series relating to DreamWorks franchises (such as Shrek, and the DreamWorks Classics library), as well as supplemental content promoting its upcoming films. The following month, the record label Awesomeness Music was announced, in partnership with Universal Music Group.

In September 2014, AwesomenessTV partnered with the department store chain Kohl's to launch a teen fashion line co-branded with its web series Life's S.o. R.a.d., as its first consumer product line. In October 2014, AwesomenessTV launched a publishing label, AwesomenessInk. As part of their ongoing relationship with DWA for original productions, Netflix announced that it had ordered a live-action Richie Rich sitcom from AwesomenessTV. In December 2014, Hearst Corporation (who published Seventeen) acquired a 25% stake in the company for $81.25 million.

In June 2015, the company hired former Lionsgate executive Matt Kaplan as president of Awesomeness Films. In August 2015, AwesomenessTV announced an output deal with Canadian children's media conglomerate DHX Media, in which the companies would co-develop and license new original content, with DHX handling international distribution and merchandising. DHX also began to acquire the studio's programming to air on its owned television network Family Channel.

On April 6, 2016, Verizon Communications, who had acquired several series from the studio (such as Guidance) for its ad-supported streaming service go90, acquired a 24.5% stake in AwesomenessTV for $159 million, valuing the company at $650 million. Alongside the equity stake, the deal included a multi-year, $180 million investment for the studio to produce content for Verizon, for which it would hold exclusive U.S. distribution rights. Verizon and AwesomenessTV also planned to launch a branded, subscription-based video service targeting mobile devices.

On April 28, 2016, Comcast's NBCUniversal subsidiary Universal Pictures announced its intent to acquire DreamWorks Animation for $3.8 billion, in a deal completed August 22, 2016. On February 22, 2017, Brian Robbins stepped down as AwesomenessTV's CEO. On November 1, 2017, it was announced that Kelly Day would step down as Chief Business Officer to become the new CEO for Viacom Digital Studios.

The planned premium content service with Verizon was later cancelled, while content investments planned for the service were reallocated to go90.

2018–present: Viacom/ViacomCBS/Paramount Global-ownership 
After a struggled launch and performance below expectations, Verizon shut down go90 in July 2018. Digiday reported that Verizon's content investments with AwesomenessTV had accounted for approximately 40% of the studio's revenue, which led to concerns over how the company would run without this backing. As NBCUniversal's parent company Comcast competed directly with Verizon, the two companies were unwilling to be in a joint venture with each other. The two companies had also become disinterested in the venture, as the exits of Brian Robbins and DWA CEO Jeffrey Katzenberg had lessened the appeal of the venture to Verizon, while Comcast did not think that the company was one of DWA's core assets, or fit alongside its other digital media investments (such as BuzzFeed). The company had planned a downsizing under its new CEO Jordan Levin.

On July 25, 2018, Viacom announced that it was in talks to acquire AwesomenessTV for a fraction of the company's $650 million valuation in 2016. Two days later, on July 27, Viacom officially announced the purchase, with a valuation initially reported to be $25 million plus the assumption of debt, but later $50 million. Operations of DreamWorksTV were taken over by NBCUniversal Direct-to-Consumer and Digital Enterprises after the purchase. Jordan Levin left his position as CEO following the acquisition.

Since the sale, the studio has operated under Viacom Digital Studios and has focused more on productions for subscription video on-demand platforms such as Hulu and Netflix, such as the film To All the Boys I've Loved Before, and PEN15—which was nominated for Outstanding Writing for a Comedy Series at the 71st Primetime Emmy Awards. The company has referred to itself as a "studio of Gen-Z".

In 2019, AwesomenessTV converted to a trade name and shortened to Awesomeness, and the parent company Viacom re-merged with CBS Corporation in December 4, making it part of the ViacomCBS (now Paramount Global) family.

Other services

Awesomeness Films 
On June 23, 2015, AwesomenessTV announced its launch of a film division.

Awesomeness News 
In 2017, AwesomenessTV launched of a news division.

Awesomeness Ink 
On October 14, 2014, Awesomeness launched a digital young adult publishing unit.

Filmography

Television productions

Current programming

Ended programming

Film productions

References

External links 
 

 
Multi-channel networks
Mass media companies established in 2012
YouTube channels launched in 2012
American companies established in 2012
2012 establishments in California
DreamWorks Animation
Former Comcast subsidiaries
Verizon Communications
Hearst Communications
Paramount Global subsidiaries
2013 mergers and acquisitions
2018 mergers and acquisitions
Nickelodeon
Paramount Media Networks
Entertainment companies based in California
Companies based in Los Angeles